Walter Robert Jack (17 November 1874 – May 1936) was a Scottish footballer who played as a centre-forward.

Biography 
Jack was born in Grangemouth. He first moved to England in April 1902, when he joined Bristol Rovers. He signed for West Bromwich Albion in May 1904, and was their top scorer in 1904–05, his only season with the club. Jack managed Clyde from July 1905 to May 1909. He died in May 1936.

References 

 

1874 births
1936 deaths
Scottish footballers
Scottish football managers
Association football forwards
Bristol Rovers F.C. players
West Bromwich Albion F.C. players
Clyde F.C. managers
People from Grangemouth
Scottish Football League managers
Footballers from Falkirk (council area)